is a Japanese publishing company in Shinjuku, Tokyo Prefecture, Japan and was established on May 12, 2003. In 2004, the company sold its stock to Poplar Publishing and now Jive is an affiliate of that company.

Magazines published
Comic Rush
Kurimoto Kaoru The Comic
Hint?
Langkose

Publishing labels
CR Comics
Jive TRPG Series
Colorful Bunko
Purefull Bunko

External links
Official website 

Book publishing companies in Tokyo
Magazine publishing companies in Tokyo
Publishing companies established in 2003